Timothy Joseph Cline (born July 22, 1994) is an American-Israeli professional basketball player who is playing for Hapoel Jerusalem of the Israeli Basketball Premier League and is also a member of the Israeli national basketball team. He played college basketball for the Richmond Spiders and the Niagara Purple Eagles. Cline is the son of Naismith Memorial Basketball Hall of Fame player Nancy Lieberman.

College career
After playing three years of junior varsity basketball at Plano West Senior High School, Cline re-made his game (and grew four inches to 6'8") and starred his senior season, earning conference offensive player of the year honors. He was able to obtain an NCAA Division I scholarship to Niagara. As a freshman, he earned Metro Atlantic Athletic Conference all-rookie team. When coach Joe Mihalich left Niagara for Hofstra, Cline chose to transfer to the University of Richmond.

At Richmond, Cline built a reputation as a scorer. In his senior season, he averaged 18.6 points and 8.1 rebounds per game. A skilled passer, Cline averaged 5.6 assists per game, unusual for a player his size. In 2014–15 he was fourth in the Atlantic 10 Conference in 2-point field goal percentage (.605). In 2015–16 he was second in the A-10 in field goal percentage (.558) and 2-point field goal percentage (.635), and sixth in points per game (18.3). In 2016–17 he was second in the A-10 in 2-point field goal percentage (.613) and assists per game (5.6), third in field goal percentage (.517), and fifth in points per game (18.3).

At the close of the 2016–17 season, Cline became the second Spiders player to be named Atlantic 10 Player of the Year. Despite playing only three seasons at Richmond, Cline finished his career ranked eighth in points and seventh in assists in Spider history.

Professional career

Galatasaray (2017)
On August 6, 2017, Cline signed with Turkish team Galatasaray for the 2017–18 season. He parted ways with Galatasaray on November 15 after seeing action in five games.

Hapoel Holon (2017–2020)

2017–18 season
On November 15, 2017, Cline signed a two-year deal with Israeli team Hapoel Holon. On November 23, 2017, Cline received an Israeli passport. On February 15, 2018, Cline won the Israeli Cup with Holon after beating perennial cup holders Maccabi Tel Aviv, 86–84 in the final game of the competition. On March 4, 2018, Cline recorded a season-high 16 points, shooting 7-for-8 from the field, along with four rebounds and two assists in a 105–88 win over Maccabi Ashdod. Cline helped Holon reach the 2018 Israeli League Final, where they eventually lost to Maccabi Tel Aviv.

2018–19 season
On July 2, 2018, Cline joined the Milwaukee Bucks for the 2018 NBA Summer League, where he averaged 3.2 points and 4 rebounds in 14 minutes per game.

On March 5, 2019, Cline recorded a career-high 19 points, shooting 8-of-12 from the field, along with four rebounds and two assists in an 85–81 win over Balkan. In 20 Israeli League games, he averaged 9.9 points, 5.6 rebounds and 2.9 assists per game. Cline helped Holon reach the 2019 FIBA Europe Cup semifinals, where they eventually were eliminated by Dinamo Sassari.

2019–20 season
On July 16, 2019, Cline re-signed with Holon for the 2019–20 season. On October 5, 2019, Cline recorded an Israeli League career-high 18 points, shooting 7-of-12 from the field, along with eight rebounds and seven assists in an 89–75 win over Hapoel Tel Aviv. Two days later, he was named Israeli League Round 1 MVP. He was named to the Basketball Champions League Team of the Week on January 16, 2020, after contributing 18 points, 10 rebounds, and two assists in a win over SIG Strasbourg. He averaged 12.9 points, 6.4 rebounds and 3.1 assists per game in Winner League.

Basket Brescia Leonessa (2020–2021)
On July 22, 2020, the day of his birthday, Cline signed a one year deal with Basket Brescia Leonessa in the Italian Lega Basket Serie A (LBA) and EuroCup Basketball.

Maccabi Tel Aviv (2021–2022)
On January 24, 2021, Cline signed a deal with Maccabi Tel Aviv of the Israeli Basketball Premier League and the Euroleague.

Capital City Go-Go (2022)
On January 21, 2022, Cline was acquired via waivers by the Capital City Go-Go, where he averaged 10.4 points and 3.7 rebounds.

MoraBanc Andorra (2022)
On April 11, 2022, Cline signed with MoraBanc Andorra of the Liga ACB.

National team career
Cline is a member of the Israeli national basketball team. On February 21, 2019, Cline made his first appearance for the Israeli team in an 81–77 win over Germany, recording 14 points and five rebounds off the bench.

Personal life
Cline was born in Plano, Texas, is Jewish, and is the son of Naismith Memorial Basketball Hall of Fame player Nancy Lieberman. During his childhood, however, his mother had already adopted Christianity, especially its born-again tradition, as detailed in a 1998 review of the book Faith in Sports: Athletes and Their Religion on and Off the Field by Steve Hubbard and a 2015 article in The Jerusalem Post.

References

External links
 Richmond Spiders bio
 Niagara Purple Eagles bio
 RealGM profile

1994 births
Living people
American expatriate basketball people in Israel
American expatriate basketball people in Turkey
American men's basketball players
Basketball players from Texas
BC Andorra players
American expatriate basketball people in Andorra
Capital City Go-Go players
Centers (basketball)
Galatasaray S.K. (men's basketball) players
Hapoel Holon players
Israeli men's basketball players
Niagara Purple Eagles men's basketball players
Power forwards (basketball)
Richmond Spiders men's basketball players
Sportspeople from Plano, Texas